Kabudeh-ye Hasanabad (also Romanized as Kabūdeh-ye Ḩasanābād) is a village in Beyranvand-e Shomali Rural District, Bayravand District, Khorramabad County, Lorestan Province, Iran. At the 2006 census, its population was 29, in 8 families.

References 

Towns and villages in Khorramabad County